Molybdenum(III) bromide is the inorganic compound with the formula MoBr3.  It is a black solid that is insoluble in most solvents but dissolves in donor solvents such as pyridine.

Preparation

It can also be prepared from the reduction of molybdenum(IV) bromide with molybdenum metal, hydrogen gas, or a hydrocarbon.

It has a structure consisting of infinite chains of face-sharing octahedra with alternatingly short and long Mo-Mo contacts. The same structure is adopted by the tribromides of ruthenium and technetium.  In contrast, in the high temperature phase of titanium(III) iodide, the Ti---Ti separation is invariant.

References

Bromides
Molybdenum halides
Molybdenum(III) compounds